The Embassy of Poland in Paris (French: Ambassade de Pologne en France) is the diplomatic mission of the Republic of Poland to the French Republic. The chancery is located in the Hôtel de Monaco on the Rue de Talleyrand.

The Hôtel de Monaco

In 1772 Princess Marie-Catherine de Brignole, having recently separated from her husband Honoré III, Prince of Monaco, purchased one of the last available plots of land in the central Parisian district of Saint Germain and instructed the notable architect Alexandre-Théodore Brongniart to build her a palace befitting her rank and worthy of her admiration as well as that of all passers-by, she passed this brief to him with the additional and express wish that the palace be both grander and more elaborate than the nearby Hôtel de Matignon.

With this in mind Brongniart set about constructing a palace set around a Cour d'Honneur with a large garden to the rear and a monumental portico above the entrance. The palace was to be approached from the Rue Dominique, where he also built for the Princess an adjacent smaller guest palace, via an avenue of birches having first passed through a monumentally elaborate wrought iron screen. The interior was planned with the occupier's comfort in mind and to this end Brongniart designed the palace so that no room would be shrouded in darkness and that all of the major state rooms would be flooded with natural light, commanding views over either the Cour d'Honneur or to the rear over the gardens of the house. His design was hailed as a breakthrough in Parisian urban architecture and soon became the standard by which other architects of the day designed their grand edifices.

Unfortunately for the princess she did not take much pleasure in her new home and enjoyed its comfort only until 1790 when she emigrated to England. Having originally rented the palace to the British ambassador, the Palace was seized by the revolutionary government and later passed through a number of hands, including those of the French Marshal Valentinois and a number of ambassadors until finally passing into those of the English banker William Williams-Hope. Hope set about turning the palace into a true great residence and it was under his instruction that the palace was expanded greatly to include a second floor, a porter's lodge, a set of wings, a folly and fountain in the garden and a greatly enlarged main body. The house was described, after Hope's many alterations, as no longer a Parisian Hôtel, for no longer was it an oasis in the greenery, but something far grander, with a much greater sense of purpose.

Hope died in 1855 and bequeathed all his earthly possessions, including the Hôtel to an English friend who went on to sell everything. After passing through the hands of another 3 occupiers the Hôtel finally fell to the Prince of Sagan and for another half century became a place of splendid receptions and glamorous balls, during this period the palace became briefly known as the Hôtel de Sagan. Yet in 1909 upon the death of the prince the palace passed to the art merchant Jacques Seligman who in 1936 sold the Hôtel to the Polish Ministry of Foreign Affairs for it to be their legation's permanent seat in Paris. Since then the palace has served continuously as the home to the Polish ambassador and his staff, interrupted only for the duration of the Second World War when it became a German cultural office. For a brief period in 1939-1940 it was even the seat of the Polish government-in-exile until the fall of France and the government's flight to the embassy in London.

Czesław Miłosz, recipient of the 1980 Nobel Prize in Literature, was the embassy's First Secretary in 1950.

The decoration of the Polish Embassy and its other sections

The Hôtel de Monaco has been changed much over the course of its existence, however its interior decoration is now thought, as a result of many of those changes, to be an example of some of the most varied and beautiful art in any of Paris's diplomatic residences. In keeping with this theme, much of the furniture and national artwork inside the palace was brought directly from the collections of the Polish Ministry of Foreign Affairs and the Polish National Museum in Warsaw.

Housed within the building are murals and paintings by Achille-Jacques Fédel (1785–1860) and Philippe Camairas (1803–1875) who designed and began the Italiante ceiling paintings, in particular those within the arches and cells in the ceiling of the music room. Nevertheless, the intrinsic pattern of flowers and scenes of dying nature that adorn the ceiling of the banqueting hall, as well as their magnificent integration into the room's setting can be attributed only to Jean-Baptiste Monnoyer (1634–1699) and the second set thereof to Jean-Baptiste Oudry (1686–1755). The ornate mantle-piece clock in the parlour is the work of bronzier Pierre- Maximilien Delafonfaine (1774–1860), and was constructed to a design by Fédel.

The other sections of the embassy exist to deal with specific matters such as consular affairs, economic and trade affairs, defence matters and much more; they can be found in many other buildings in close vicinity to the Hôtel de Monaco.

See also
France-Poland relations
List of diplomatic missions of Poland
Foreign relations of Poland
Polish nationality law
List of ambassadors of Poland to France

References

External links
Embassy of Poland in Paris 

Poland
Paris
France–Poland relations